Burdukovo is a rural locality (a village) in Ustretskoye Rural Settlement, Syamzhensky District, Vologda Oblast, Russia. The population was 9 as of 2002.

Geography 
Burdukovo is located 29 km west of Syamzha (the district's administrative centre) by road. Fedosikha is the nearest rural locality.

References 

Rural localities in Syamzhensky District